Sherer is a surname. Notable people with the surname include:
 Albert W. Sherer Jr. (1916–1986), American diplomat
 Charlie Sherer (1903–1967), Australian rules footballer
 Dave Sherer (born 1937), American football player
 David Sherer (born 1957), American physician and author
 Dustin Sherer, indoor American football player
 Leigh Sherer (born 1973), American beauty pageant winner
 Moshe Sherer (1921–1998), Israeli Jewish religious leader
 Moyle Sherer (1789–1869), British army officer, traveller, and writer
 Rod Sherer (born 1964), American politician
 Teal Sherer (born 1980), American actress
 Tommy Sherer (born 1948), American politician